Whitley Beaumont was an estate in the county of West Yorkshire, England, near Huddersfield. Whitley Hall (now demolished) was the seat of the Beaumont family. A part of the former estate is now in use as a Scout camp-site.

History

In around 1200, the lord of Pontefract castle, Roger de Laci presented William Bellomonte, ancestor of the Beaumonts of Whitley, 24 bovates of land in Huddersfield, half meadow and half wood and four marks rent on the mill in the same place. 
Although there were probably houses built on the site in the interim, the first documented Hall was built by Sir Richard Beaumont in the early 17th century. The house was then rebuilt in the 18th century in an imposing Georgian style using local millstone grit. The gardens were landscaped by Capability Brown.

By the early part of the 20th century the house stood empty and the fittings were sold in 1917. The estate was then bought in 1924 by Charles Sutcliffe an industrialist. Unfortunately, this was not enough to save the house and estate and it continued to deteriorate until it was sold in 1950 and split up, the major part to an opencast mining company and the house was demolished.

Scouting

Charles Sutcliffe first allowed Scouts to use the kitchen gardens to camp in 1928 or 1929 and after the 1950 break-up of the estate an area of land south of the hall passed into the hands of the Huddersfield Scout districts. It is now run by volunteers reporting to Huddersfield South-East district.

References

External links
 Whitley Beaumont Camp-site

Country houses in West Yorkshire
Gardens by Capability Brown